ADaMSoft is a free and open-source statistical software developed in Java and can run on any platform supporting Java.

History 
ADaMSoft was initially started by Marco Scarnò as a simple prototype of the statistical software developed by UNESCO and called WinIDAMS. Later it resulted useful for several activities of the CASPUR statistical group (ADaMS group). The software was further developed until it became an interesting package which was tested and, finally, opened to the web community.

Features

Statistical methods 
ADaMSoft can perform a wide range of analytical methods:
 Neural Networks MLP
 Graphs
 Data Mining
 Linear regression
 Logistic regression
 Methods for Statistical classification
 Record linkage methods
 Contains algorithms for Decision trees
 Cluster analysis
 Data Editing and imputation
 Principal component analysis
 Correspondence analysis

Data sources 
It can read/write statistical data values from various/to sources including:
 Text Files
 Excel Spreadsheets
 ODBC data sources
 MySQL
 Postgresql
 Oracle

Web Application Server 
By using the ADaMSoft Web Application Server it is possible to use all the software facilities through the web; in other words to let that internet users can access to the ADaMSoft procedures without having it installed.

References

External links 
 ADaMSoft SourceForge
 Softsea - ADaMSoft

qw

Free software programmed in Java (programming language)
Free statistical software